Rahul Dagar (born 4 July 1993) is an Indian first-class cricketer who plays for Haryana. He made his Twenty20 debut on 2 January 2016 in the 2015–16 Syed Mushtaq Ali Trophy.

References

External links
 

1993 births
Living people
Indian cricketers
Haryana cricketers
Place of birth missing (living people)